The Belarus men's national basketball team represented Belarus in international basketball matches, and are controlled by the Belarusian Basketball Federation. They came into existence in 1992 after the dissolution of the Soviet Union. The team played in their first official match the following year versus Lithuania. They are Europe's most populous nation to have never qualified for a major international basketball competition.

After the 2022 Russian invasion of Ukraine, FIBA suspended Belarus from participating in international competitions.

History

Prior to independence
Before 1992, Belarus was occupied by the Soviet Union, with Belarusian born players taking part on the Soviet Union national team.

Ensuing years
After Belarus gained independence from the Soviet Union, their first attempt to qualify for the premier European basketball tournament came in 1993. They ultimately came up short in their attempt. Throughout the rest of the 1990s and 2000s, Belarus were unsuccessful at securing qualification. During qualifying for the EuroBasket 2017, Belarus was stationed into Group D with another opportunity to reach the EuroBasket finals. The team began the qualifiers with two loses, before earning their first victory at home against Portugal. Belarus went on to win twice more to conclude the qualifiers at a record of (3–3), but it wasn't enough as the team was eliminated.

For qualification to the 2019 FIBA World Cup, Belarus first went through European Pre-Qualifiers. Belarus would finish with a (1–3) record in their pre-qualifying group, but would advance to the first round of the qualifiers; due to owning the point difference in their head-to-head against Portugal. There, they were placed in Group A, and right away the national team were overwhelmed in their first two matches by dominant performances from Slovenia and Montenegro respectively. They eventually notched their first win in the group in a rematch against Slovenia, but to no avail. Belarus finished with a (1–5) record and failed to advance.                                                                                                           

Belarus later went on to compete in EuroBasket 2022 Pre-Qualifiers, but were eliminated in a match to Denmark, in the final pre-qualifying window 69–66.

Competitive record

FIBA World Cup

Olympic Games

EuroBasket

Team

Current roster
Roster for the 2023 FIBA World Cup Qualifiers matches on 25 and 28 November 2021 against Turkey and Greece.

Depth chart

Head coach position
 Aliaksandr Papkou – (2008–2009)
 Mikhail Feiman – (2010)
 Andrei Krivonos – (2011–2012)
 Ruslan Baidakov – (2013–2014)
 Dušan Gvozdić – (2014)
 Aleksander Krutikov – (2015–2019)
 Rostislav Vergun – (2019–present)

Recent results and upcoming fixtures

2020

2021

2022

See also

Sport in Belarus
Belarus women's national basketball team
Belarus men's national under-18 basketball team
Belarus men's national under-16 basketball team
Soviet Union men's national basketball team

Notes

References

External links
Official website 
Belarus at FIBA site
Belarus National Team – Men at Eurobasket.com
Belarus Basketball Records at FIBA Archive

Men's national basketball teams
National team
Basketball
1992 establishments in Belarus